Poospiza is a genus of  finch-like birds in the tanager family Thraupidae that are found in both the South American lowlands and the Andes mountains. Generally they are arboreal feeders in light woodland and scrub. All have extensive grey to their plumage, and have—often bold—white or rufous markings.

Taxonomy and species list 
The genus Poospiza was introduced in 1847 by the German ornithologist Jean Cabanis. The name combines the Ancient Greek poa meaning "grass" and spiza meaning "finch". The type species was designated as the black-and-rufous warbling finch by the English zoologist George Robert Gray in 1855.

A molecular phylogenetic study of the tanager family published in 2014 found that Poospiza and many other genera were polyphyletic. In the subsequent reorganization two species from Compsospiza and two species from Hemispingus were moved here. At the same time several species formerly assigned to Poospiza were moved to Microspingus, Poospizopsis and Castanozoster.

The genus contains ten species:

References

Sources
 Ridgely, R. S., & G. Tudor. 1989. The Birds of South America, vol. 1. Univ. Texas Press, Austin.

 
Bird genera